Chutzpah is the quality of audacity, for good or for bad. It derives from the Hebrew word , meaning "insolence", "cheek" or "audacity". Thus the original Yiddish word has a strongly negative connotation but the form which entered English as a Yiddishism in American English has taken on a broader meaning, having been popularized through vernacular use in film, literature, and television. The word is sometimes interpreted—particularly in business parlance—as meaning the amount of courage, mettle or ardor that an individual has.

Etymology

Originated 1890–95 from Yiddish חוצפּה‎ (ḥuṣpâ), from Mishnaic Hebrew חוֹצְפָּה‎ (ḥôṣǝpâ), from חָצַף‎ (ḥāṣap, “to be insolent”). Ultimately from Aramaic חֲצִיפָא‎ (ḥăṣîpāʾ), חֲצַף‎ (ḥaṣap, “to be barefaced, insolent”).

In Hebrew, chutzpah is used indignantly, to describe someone who has overstepped the boundaries of accepted behavior. In traditional usage, the word expresses a strong sense of disapproval, condemnation and outrage.

Leo Rosten in The Joys of Yiddish defines chutzpah as "gall, brazen nerve, effrontery, incredible 'guts', presumption plus arrogance such as no other word and no other language can do justice to". In this sense, chutzpah expresses both strong disapproval and condemnation.  In the same work, Rosten also defines the term as "that quality enshrined in a man who, having killed his mother and father, throws himself on the mercy of the court because he is an orphan."

Chutzpah amounts to a total denial of personal responsibility, which renders others speechless and incredulous ... one cannot quite believe that another person totally lacks common human traits like remorse, regret, guilt, sympathy and insight.  The implication is at least some degree of psychopathy in the subject, as well as the awestruck amazement of the observer at the display.

In Rabbinical literature 

Rabbi Harold M. Schulweis distinguishes the meaning of chutzpah as stubbornness and contrariness from what he calls a tradition of "spiritual audacity" or "chutzpah klapei shmaya":

As an example, Schulweis cites a case where Moses argues with God about the justice of His commands:

Contemporary usage

Judge Alex Kozinski and Eugene Volokh in an article entitled Lawsuit Shmawsuit, note the rise in use of Yiddish words in legal opinion.  They note that chutzpah has been used 231 times in American legal opinions, 220 of those after 1980. Chutzpah first appeared in a Supreme Court decision in 1998, in National Endowment for the Arts v. Finley, when Justice Antonin Scalia used it to describe the NEA's brazenness in asking for government funding.

In the movie Haider (2014) by Vishal Bharadwaj, a modern-day interpretation of Hamlet set against the backdrop of Kashmir in the midst of political conflict, the protagonist uses the word chutzpah which they pronounce as /'tʃʊtspə/ instead of /ˈhʊtspə/ or /ˈxʊtspə/ to describe India's way of treating the people of Kashmir since the beginning of the conflict. This pronunciation sounds more like Indian slang.

The Polish word hucpa (pronounced [ˈxut͜spa]) is also derived from this term, although its meaning is closer to 'insolence' or 'arrogance', and so it is typically used in a more negative sense instead of denoting a positive description of someone's audacity.

Similarly, the German form of chutzpah is Chuzpe.

'Chutzpah' is a primary statistic for player and non-player characters in the roleplaying game Paranoia.

See also
Gopnik
Cojones
Firgun
Hubris
Sisu
List of English words of Yiddish origin

References

External links

 Chutzpah Pronunciation

Yiddish words and phrases
Personality traits
Words and phrases describing personality